In Australia, murder, like most criminal law, is defined by  legislation.

South Australia 
In South Australia, the Criminal Law Consolidation Act 1935, states: 

No further definition for murder can be found within the Act. 'Life' is also poorly defined, with section 5 of the Act stating: 

Instead, particulars of 'murder' and 'life' are defined by the common law. However, because this provision of law uses mandatory language ('shall be imprisoned for life'), it clearly indicates that life imprisonment is thus the mandatory punishment for murder in South Australia.

New South Wales 
In the NSW Crimes Act 1900 murder is defined as follows:

Under NSW law, the maximum penalty for murder is life imprisonment, with a standard non-parole period of 20 years, or 25 years for the murder of a child under the age of 18. In order to be found guilty of murder under the New South Wales Crimes Act 1900, intent to cause grievous bodily harm or reckless indifference to human life is sufficient to secure a conviction for murder. Reckless indifference to human life is characterised by the awareness of the probability (as opposed to possibility), of the accused's act resulting in a person's death (as opposed to merely resulting in grievous bodily harm).
Felony murder (called constructive murder in Australian jurisdictions) and murder by omission are also recognised crimes in this jurisdiction. 

Section 23 of the Crimes Act 1900 provides for the partial defence of provocation, and can refer to actions taken by the deceased both immediately before, and prior to, the murder. If proven by the defence where there is a charge of murder, the jury will be directed to reduce the offence to manslaughter. If prior to or at the time of the committal proceedings an offender enters a plea of guilty to the lesser offence of manslaughter on the grounds of provocation, and it is accepted by the Crown, they are entitled to a discount on their corresponding sentence. 

However, this is not the case in Victoria, Tasmania or Western Australia - the Crimes Act 1958 (Vic), in Section 3B, states:

In assessing guilt for murder, the intention in the precise method in which death occurred is irrelevant as long as the requisite mens rea and actus reus is satisfied. The relevant actus reus for murder is where an act (or omission) has caused death.

The mens rea for murder is:
 an intent to kill;
 an intent to inflict grievous bodily harm; or
 reckless indifference to human life, where the defendant foresaw the probability, as opposed to possibility, of his or her actions resulting in death. 
In NSW, a person can also be found guilty of murder if they kill a person during or immediately after the commission of a crime that is punishable by imprisonment of 25 years or more.

See also
List of murder laws by country

References

Australia
Murder in Australia
Australian criminal law